Trinidad is an American documentary film by Jay Hodges and PJ Raval. The film was screened at the IFP Market and IFP Rough Cuts Lab. In 2009, the film premiered on Showtime.

Synopsis
Dr. Stanley Biber began conducting sex reassignment therapy in Trinidad, Colorado, in 1969. Dr. Marci Bowers, a former patient of Biber, took over his practice after his death. Trinidad focuses on Bowers and two of her patients at different stages of their transition from male to female.

Cast
Stanley Biber
Marci Bowers
Laura Ellis
Sabrina Marcus

Production

Development
Directors Jay Hodges and PJ Raval were intrigued by Trinidad's status as the "Sex Change Capital of the World" and that Marci Bowers, the surgeon of the town, had transgender history. Neither director lived in the town, so they filmed in intervals of several months at a time. In an interview with Queerty, Raval said, "Our intention was not to sensationalize or exploit but to create something where people can see the universal struggle for self-expression and give people an opportunity to explore these concepts of gender and gender identity."

Trinidad received $4,000 for production and $7,000 for post-production through the Austin Film Society's Texas Filmmakers' Production Fund.

Music
Trinidad features music by Antony and the Johnsons, The Cinematic Orchestra, and Julia Kent.

Reception

Critical response
Eric Campos, writing for Film Threat, gave the film 4 out of 5 stars and said, "Trinidad succeeds in presenting the materials for a better understanding of transsexual people and stands to be very instrumental in making the world outside of Trinidad, Colorado a safer place for them to live." IFCs Stephen Salto commented, "Hodges and Raval arrive in town just in time to shoot the construction of Morning Glow, a recovery house that not only provides a dramatic arc for the story, but slyly demonstrates how post-ops are just like anyone else, in moments as simple as arguing over the proper trim for the doors of the house."

Accolades

See also

 Sex Change Hospital (2007)
 TransGeneration (2005)
 A Change of Sex (1980)

References

External links
 
 

2008 documentary films
2008 films
American documentary films
Transgender-related documentary films
American LGBT-related films
2008 LGBT-related films
Films about trans women
Transgender and medicine
2000s English-language films
2000s American films